Sukkah (hut) is a book of the Mishnah and Talmud. It is the sixth volume in the Order (Mishnaic section) of Moed. Sukkah deals primarily with laws relating to the Jewish holiday of Sukkot. It has five chapters.

Included in its scope are the topics of:
 The Sukkah, or hut, which is lived in during Sukkot
 Laws concerning each of the four species of vegetation which are waved during prayers over the holiday
 The Celebration of the Water-Drawing which took place at the Temple in Jerusalem on the nights of Sukkot.

External links and resources
Mishna fulltext (Hebrew)
Talmud Bavli fulltext (Hebrew)
Mishna Translation with the commentary of Pinchas Kehati